"What's a Woman?" is a 1990 pop-rock song recorded by Belgian band Vaya Con Dios. It was the second single from band's second studio album, Night Owls (1990). It achieved success in many European countries, topping the chart in the Netherlands, and becoming a top-five hit for three weeks in France. To date, it is Vaya Con Dios' most successful song.

In 2006, the band re-recorded the song as a duet with Aaron Neville, available on its best-of The Ultimate Collection. About this version by Neville, Dani Klein said in an interview : "We were discussing the whole project at Sony BMG and they asked me "Who would you like to do a duet with?" The first person that came into my mind was Aaron Neville, because I'd seen him a few months ago here in Brussels and I was just amazed at his voice! This man has a unique voice... his voice is incomparable. The song goes "What's a woman if a man doesn't treat her right?" And the fact that a man sings that gives it another dimension. I thought that was interesting."

The song is featured in the Swedish movie Vingar av Glas (Wings of Glass), starring Alexander Skarsgård.

Track listings
These are the formats and track listings of major single releases of "What's a Woman?".

 7" single
 "What's a Woman?" – 3:56
 "Far Gone Now" – 3:08

 CD maxi
 "What's A Woman?" – 3:56
 "Far Gone Now" – 3:08
 "I Sold My Soul" – 4:56

Credits

 Written by Dani Klein, Dirk Schoufs and Jean-Michel Gielen
 Arranged by Dirk Schoufs and Jean-Michel Gielen
 Artwork by Label & Labeat
 Photography by Roger Dijckmans
 Produced by Dani Klein and Dirk Schoufs

Charts

Weekly charts

Year-end charts

Decade-end charts

Certifications

References

1990 singles
Ultratop 50 Singles (Flanders) number-one singles
Dutch Top 40 number-one singles
English-language Belgian songs
Pop ballads
Vaya Con Dios (band) songs
Songs written by Dani Klein
1990 songs
Ariola Records singles